The Davis Phinney Foundation is a non-profit with a mission to help people with Parkinson's live well with the disease. It was founded in 2004 by Davis Phinney, a former professional road bicycle racer and Olympic medal winner. Today, Davis is an inspirational figure in the cycling community and people living with Parkinson's (estimated 60,000 Americans and estimated 10 million worldwide).

The Foundation is a 501(c)(3) public charity that functions without an endowment and depends on donations from individuals, foundations and corporations. It reaches an international audience through its programs and online programming.

History
As an Olympic Bronze medalist and Tour de France stage winner, Phinney has the most victories of any cyclist in American history. From the late 1970s until his retirement from professional cycling in 1993, Phinney achieved 328 victories. Phinney is one of only three Americans who have won multiple stages of the Tour de France. Greg LeMond and Lance Armstrong are the others.

In 2000, Phinney was 40 when he was diagnosed with young-onset Parkinson's disease after years of feeling "off". Shortly after his Parkinson's diagnosis, Davis and his family moved to Italy. While living there, Phinney was contacted by Kathleen Krumme, a cyclist who asked Phinney to let her use his name in conjunction with her ride (the Sunflower Revolution) to benefit Parkinson's. From this connection, the Davis Phinney Foundation was born.

Phinney realized there were many ways he could improve the quality of his daily life with Parkinson's, including through exercise. He started the Davis Phinney Foundation as a way to fund and advance research that demonstrates the benefits of exercise, speech therapy, and other behavioral elements that are critical to quality of life with Parkinson's. It has since expanded to include a variety of programming that helps people with Parkinson's take a more active role in their own care.

Programs
 The Victory Summit symposia series brings together people in local Parkinson's communities for a day of inspiration and learning. The seminars include presentations by researchers, clinicians, and physical therapists who share the latest information and tools that people with Parkinson's can use to enhance their quality of life. The Victory Summit symposia are free and available to anyone who would like to participate.
 Every Victory Counts is a manual on living well with Parkinson's created by the foundation. It is meant to inform and inspire people living with the disease, care partners and family members to take control of their Parkinson's treatment via proactive self-care. The Every Victory Counts manual is free of charge to individuals and is available upon request.
 The Living Well Challenge is a free, educational webinar series that features neurologists and other movement disorder experts speaking on topics of interest to people affected by Parkinson's disease. New videos air bi-monthly on the Davis Phinney Foundation website.
 Parkinson's Exercise Essentials : Getting Started, Staying Motivated, and Seeing Results, is an instructional video program on exercising with Parkinson's disease. The program includes workouts that can be performed at home, in a fitness center or in the community. The workouts include guidance and adaptations for a range of ages and stages of Parkinson's, from diagnosis through advanced stages of the disease. The program videos are available on the Davis Phinney Foundation website.

Research
The Davis Phinney Foundation funds research that explores a range of factors that affect quality of life. Its primary interest is in funding research related to exercise; however, it has also funded research in depression, telemedicine, deep brain stimulation and speech. The tendency is to fund smaller, innovative studies that lead to proof of concept and greater funding from larger institutions, such as the National Institute of Health and the Michael J. Fox Foundation.

Fundraising activities
The Foundation's grassroots fundraising initiative, Team DPF, raises funds and awareness for Parkinson's disease. Team DPF members turn all types of events and activities, from bike rides and runs, to mountain climbs, to sales of original works of art into fundraisers benefiting the Foundation. The Davis Phinney Foundation also has a Pay It Forward initiative tied to The Victory Summit symposia, wherein attendees of the free events are asked to donate in order to fund future events. Fully 81% of the Foundation's revenue is devoted to funding program services.

References

External links
 Official website

Health charities in the United States
Parkinson's disease
Neurology organizations
Medical and health organizations based in Colorado